Nathan Jay Berkus (born September 17, 1971) is an American interior designer, author, and television personality. He runs the Chicago interior design firm Nate Berkus Associates and was a regularly featured guest on The Oprah Winfrey Show, offering design advice to viewers as well as coordinating surprise make-overs for people's homes. He has released numerous lines of products and authored several books.

His talk show, The Nate Berkus Show, debuted in broadcast syndication September 13, 2010, featuring make-overs, culture, design, and personal advice.  It was co-produced by Harpo Productions and Sony Pictures Television, and was cancelled in 2012 after two seasons. Since 2017, Berkus has co-hosted the TLC reality design series Nate & Jeremiah by Design, alongside his husband Jeremiah Brent.

Early life and education
Berkus was born on September 17, 1971, in Orange County, California. Designer Nancy Golden, from multiple series on HGTV and DIY Network, is his mother. His father, Michael A. Berkus, co-founded the National Sports Collectors Convention. His parents divorced in 1973. Berkus grew up in a Jewish family mainly in Hopkins, Minnesota. He attended Cushing Academy, a boarding school in Ashburnham, Massachusetts.

Berkus started working in design immediately after leaving high school and interned at Dominique Aurientis in Paris and Leslie Hindman in Chicago. Berkus graduated from Lake Forest College in 1994, with B.A. degrees in French and Sociology. He founded the company, Nate Berkus Associates, in Chicago in 1995. Berkus is related to the venture capitalist Dave Berkus, architect Barry Berkus, musician/artist Günther Berkus, Josh Berkus of Software in the Public Interest, casino manager/author Eric David Berkus, and lawyer Matt Berkus.

Career
In November 2005, Hyperion Books published Berkus's book Home Rules: Transform the Place You Live into a Place You'll Love, a step-by-step guide to home design and decoration.

In 2005, Berkus began selling his merchandise at Linens 'n Things stores throughout North America.

Berkus was the host of the short-lived reality show Oprah's Big Give, which premiered March 2, 2008, but the series ended on April 20 that same year. On May 13, 2008, it was announced by ABC that it would not be renewed for a second season.

On September 13, 2010, he debuted as the host of his own syndicated daily show, The Nate Berkus Show, which was co-produced by Harpo Productions and Sony Pictures Television. It was recorded in Studio 42 at the CBS Broadcast Center in New York, but aired in the nation's largest markets on the ten NBC-owned-and-operated stations. His guests included sex therapist Dr. Ruth Westheimer, whose living room and dining room he redecorated, after 50 years. In December 2011, Sony Pictures decided not to renew The Nate Berkus Show for a third season.
Berkus is also an executive producer of the 2011 film The Help.

He appeared as himself on the October 12, 2011 and October 13, 2011 episodes of Days of Our Lives, a United States daytime television soap opera, designing the offices of MadWorld Cosmetics for Madison James.

Berkus's book The Things That Matter was published October 16, 2012 by Spiegel & Grau. It became a New York Times Best Seller and was named "One of the Best Interior Design Books of the Year" by the Washington Post.

Also in October 2012, Berkus collaborated with Target stores to launch his Target Home collection, a 150-piece line that includes bedding, bath, accessories, lighting, rugs, and window treatments. Since then he has released many different collections for season changes as well as holidays. He recently released a line of stationery and office essentials alongside his 2015 Cali-inspired spring collection.

In January 2013, Berkus introduced his own fabric collection at Calico Corners.

In March 2013, television journalists noted Berkus began working on a primetime series with NBC, initially titled Renovation Nation. By May 2013 the title was changed to American Dream Builders. Berkus was the host and one of the producers of the show in which, according to NBC, "American top designers, builders, architects and landscapers go head-to-head each week, putting their talents to the test on extreme home renovations." The show was not renewed after its first season.

Alongside his husband, fellow interior designer Jeremiah Brent, he launched in 2017 the TV show Nate & Jeremiah by Design broadcast on TLC network.  On August 30, 2017 it was announced that Nate & Jeremiah by Design had been picked up for a second season.

In 2020, Berkus helped rebuild Ellicott City, Maryland in Gordon Ramsay's untimed special.

Personal life

In December 2004, Berkus and his then-partner, photographer Fernando Bengoechea, were vacationing at a beach resort in Sri Lanka when the 2004 Indian Ocean tsunami hit. While Berkus survived, Bengoechea was missing and presumed dead. Berkus appeared on The Oprah Winfrey Show on January 17, 2005, to talk about the ordeal and the loss of his partner.

In April 2013 Berkus became engaged to fellow interior designer Jeremiah Brent after nearly a year of dating. They were married on May 4, 2014, in Manhattan. They have two children born via surrogates: a daughter, Poppy Brent-Berkus, born on March 23, 2015, and a son, Oskar Michael Brent-Berkus, born on March 26, 2018. Berkus and his family currently live in Manhattan.

In early 2014, they were featured in clothier Banana Republic's "True Outfitters" ads in InStyle and Rolling Stone, among other magazines. The New York Times noted they were the first same-sex couple to be featured in ads for the magazines. Their Manhattan apartment was featured in the October 2015 issue of Architectural Digest magazine, where Nate Berkus and Jeremiah Brent appeared on the cover with their daughter Poppy.

Further reading
 Who is Nate Berkus? Your Life, The Boston Globe March 23, 2006
 "Gay designer returns home from tsunami-ravaged region" – article from Advocate.com

See also

Interior designer

References

External links
 
 The Nate Berkus Show
 
 Nick Berkus' Facebook Page
 Nate Berkus' (Fanmade) Latest Updates Website

1971 births
American interior designers
20th-century American Jews
Gay Jews
Lake Forest College alumni
American LGBT broadcasters
LGBT people from California
LGBT television producers
Living people
LGBT people from Minnesota
People from Orange County, California
American gay writers
Artists from Minneapolis
21st-century American Jews